Something Wicked This Way Comes may refer to:

Literature
 "Something wicked this way comes", a line spoken by a witch in Shakespeare's Macbeth
 Something Wicked This Way Comes (novel), a 1962 novel by Ray Bradbury

Film, television and theater
 Something Wicked This Way Comes (film), a 1983 adaptation of Bradbury's novel
 "Something Wicked This Way Comes" (Joan of Arcadia), a 2005 television episode
 "Something Wicked This Way Comes" (Project Runway All Stars), a 2014 television episode
 "Something Wicked This Way Comes" (Ugly Betty), a 2007 television episode
 Something Wicked This Way Comes (stage show), a 2005–2006 touring show by Derren Brown

Music

Albums
 Something Wicked This Way Comes (Cheyne album), 2004
 Something Wicked This Way Comes (The Herbaliser), 2002
 Something Wicked This Way Comes (Iced Earth album), 1998
 Something Wicked This Way Comes, by Eibon la Furies, 2006
 Something Wicked This Way Comes, by the Enid, 1983
 Something Wicked This Way Comes, by Thunderstick, 2017
 Something Wicked This Way Comes (Cold EP), 2000
 Somethin' Wicked This Way Comes, an EP by Wolfpac, 1999

Songs
 "Something Wicked This Way Comes", by Barry Adamson from the Lost Highway film soundtrack, 1997
 "Something Wicked This Way Comes", by Doro from Doro, 1990
 "Something Wicked This Way Comes", by Lordi from To Beast or Not to Beast, 2013
 "Something Wicked This Way Comes", by Lucinda Williams from Down Where the Spirit Meets the Bone, 2014
 "Something Wicked This Way Comes", by Redemption from Redemption, 2003
 "Something Wicked (This Way Comes)", by Siouxsie & the Banshees, B-side of "The Killing Jar", 1988
 "Something Wicked This Way Comes", by Wednesday 13 from Calling All Corpses, 2011
 "Sumthin' Wicked This Way Comes", by TLC from CrazySexyCool, 1994

Other uses
 "Something Wicked This Way Comes", a 1997 promotional tagline for the second-generation Lexus GS car line

See also
 Something Wicked (disambiguation)
Something Bitchin' This Way Comes, an album by Lock Up
Something Green and Leafy This Way Comes, an album by SNFU
 "Something Ricked This Way Comes", an episode of Rick and Morty
 "Something Wall-Mart This Way Comes", an episode of South Park
 "Something Wicca This Way Comes", the first episode of the television series Charmed